Bollea may refer to:

 Pescatoria, a genus of orchid, formerly named Bollea
 Terry Gene Bollea (Hulk Hogan), wrestler
 Michael Allan Bollea (Horace Hogan), wrestler and nephew of Hulk Hogan
 Brooke Bollea (Brooke Hogan), reality TV personality and daughter of Hulk Hogan
 Nicholas Bollea (Nick Hogan), reality TV personality and son of Hulk Hogan

See also
 Bollea v. Gawker, a 2013 sex tape publicity lawsuit
 Bollée (disambiguation)